FC 08 Villingen is a German association football club based in Villingen-Schwenningen, Baden-Württemberg. The association was founded on 1 October 1908 and over time absorbed other local clubs including Germania, Alemania and Phönix.



History
By the mid-20s the club was playing in the highest level local league, the Bezirksliga Baden, but had descended to lower level play by the early 30s. They recovered themselves to return to high level district league play by the end of the decade and in 1935 sent defender Hermann Gramlich (3 caps) to the national side.

Following World War II all organizations in the country, including football and sports associations, were ordered dissolved by occupying Allied authorities. Most were quickly re-established, including the Villingen side which was re-formed as ASV Villingen before once again assuming its traditional identity in 1949. In 1951 FC Villingen was promoted to the Amateurliga Südbaden (II) where they immediately took the division title. The club continued to play well and repeated as champions in 1955, after which they slipped to become a mid-table side.

After the 1959–60 season the club became part of the newly formed Amateurliga Schwarzwald-Bodensee (III) where they played until elevated to the second division Regionalliga Süd after a title win in 1966. They earned mid-table results there until being relegated in 1972 carrying with them a heavy debt burden that hobbled the club for years. They captured Amateurliga Schwarzwald-Bodensee (III) championships in 1973 and 1974 before moving over to the Amateurliga Südbaden, in what was now fourth-tier football after league re-organization in the country, where they won their third title in four years in 1976. Through the 70s the team enjoyed success in regional cup play taking the Südbadischer Pokal in 1974, 1976, and 1979.

After another shuffle of German football leagues, 08 was placed in the newly formed Amateur Oberliga Baden-Württemberg (III) where they played for a couple of seasons before descending to the Verbandsliga Südbaden (IV) in 1980. They twice clawed their way back up on the strength of Verbandsliga titles in 1983 and 1985 before settling into fourth-tier play until the mid-90s. A second-place finish in 1994 kept the club in fourth-division play in the Oberliga Baden-Württemberg for a single season, after which they were relegated to the now fifth division Verbandliga Südbaden. Since the turn of the millennium the club has played as an "elevator side" moving up and down between the Verbandsliga and Oberliga. Villingen currently plays in the Oberliga Baden-Württemberg (IV) after being promoted following their latest Verbandsliga title in 2006. In the 2014–15 season the club came third-last in the league and was nominally relegated but the withdrawal of VfR Aalen II and the promotion of Bahlinger SC to the Regionalliga meant Villingen survived in the league for another season before being relegated in 2016.

Stadium
The club plays its home matches at the Friedengrund which was built in 1960 and has a capacity of 12,000 (800 seats). From 1925 to 1961 FCV played at the Waldstraße.

Current squad

Honours
The club's honours:

League
 Bezirksliga Baden
 Champions: 1936
 Amateurliga Südbaden (III)
 Champions: 1948, 1951, 1956, 1976
 Runners-up: 1953
 Amateurliga Schwarzwald-Bodensee (III)
 Champions: 1966, 1973, 1974
 Verbandsliga Südbaden (IV/V/VI)
 Champions: 1983, 1985, 2001, 2004, 2006, 2017
 Runners-up: 1994

Cup
 South Baden Cup (Tiers III-VII)
 Winners: 1950, 1974, 1976, 1979, 2005, 2007, 2009, 2016, 2019, 2021

Recent managers
Recent managers of the club:

Recent seasons
The recent season-by-season performance of the club:

 With the introduction of the Regionalligas in 1994 and the 3. Liga in 2008 as the new third tier, below the 2. Bundesliga, all leagues below dropped one tier.

References

External links
 Official team site
 Abseits Guide to German Soccer
 Das deutsche Fußball-Archiv (historical German domestic league results)
 FC 08 Villingen at Weltfussball.de

Association football clubs established in 1908
Football clubs in Germany
Football clubs in Baden-Württemberg
Villingen-Schwenningen
1908 establishments in Germany